The Olympic Laurel is a distinction awarded by the International Olympic Committee (IOC) to honour those who have "made significant achievements in education, culture, development and peace through sport". It was introduced in 2016 to implement part of recommendation 26 of Olympic Agenda 2020, and will be presented during the opening ceremony of each Olympic Games. IOC President Thomas Bach stated that the award reconnects the Olympics the ideals and values of the Ancient Olympic Games. The trophy features a laurel wreath and the Olympic rings which are made out of Fairmined Gold and the base is a stone from Ancient Olympia.

List of Olympic Laurel recipients

References

Laurel
International orders, decorations, and medals
Sports trophies and awards
Awards established in 2016